Suresh Kumar may refer to:
 Suresh Kumar (government official), U.S. government official
 Suresh Kumar (mountaineer), Indian mountaineer
 S. Suresh Kumar (born 1955), Indian politician in Karnataka 
 Suresh Rana or Suresh Kumar, Indian politician in Uttar Pradesh
 Selvam Suresh Kumar, Indian cricketer